The New York and Boston Rapid Transit Company planned to build a rapid transit line between New York City and Boston, Massachusetts.

Charles F. Conant acted as financial agent for the group of investors.

The idea was to start the railroad at the Boston and Lowell Railroad's terminal in Boston (now part of North Station), and run it along the B&L's new alignment (which had been made obsolete by the 1887 merger with the Boston and Maine Railroad), splitting at the merge with the old alignment, and heading southwest across Cambridge parallel to the Grand Junction Railroad. After crossing the Charles River the path continued through rural Massachusetts to Willimantic, New Haven and Bridgeport, Connecticut, entering Manhattan at High Bridge and going down the west side of Central Park to a terminal at Columbus Circle.

References
Rutherford B. Hayes Presidential Center - Charles F. Conant
Rapid Transit to Boston, The New York Times, August 10, 1887, page 2

Further reading

 "An Air Line Scheme," The Gazette. Fort Worth, Texas, June 11, 1884, page 4
 "A New Route to Boston," The Sun, New York City, May 28, 1887, page 1
"New England News," Essex County Herald, Guildhall, Vermont, October 21, 1887, image 4
 "Rapid Transit to Boston," The Sun, New York City, November 4, 1887, page 5

Defunct Massachusetts railroads
Defunct Connecticut railroads
Defunct New York (state) railroads